The Pneumodermatidae are a family of sea angels, or small floating predatory sea snails or sea slugs. They are pelagic marine heterobranch opisthobranch gastropod mollusks in the clade Gymnosomata.

These small pelagic snails lack shells (except in their early embryonic stage). They are carnivores, equipped with swimming parapoda (fleshy, wing-like outgrowths), strong jaws, and grasping tentacles, often with suckers resembling those of cephalopods.

Genera 
Genera within the family Pneumodermatidae include:

Genus: Pneumoderma de Roissy, 1805
 Pneumoderma atlanticum Oken, 1815
 Pneumoderma degraaffi van der Spoel & Pafort-van Iersel, 1982 – distribution: Sargasso Sea, length: 11.8 mm
 Pneumoderma mediterraneum van Beneden, 1838 – distribution: Florida, Brazil, Mediterranean, length: 20 mm
 Pneumoderma peronii Lamarck, 1819 – distribution: Red Sea
 Pneumoderma violaceum d'Orbigny, 1836 – distribution: Bermuda, oceanic, length: 25 mm, description: This pteropod grabs its prey with two powerful suckers, each with about 30 suctorial disks, then it bulges out its long proboscis.
 Pneumoderma violaceum pacificum Dall, 1871
 Pneumoderma violaceum violaceum d'Orbigny, 1836

Genus: Pneumodermopsis Keferstein, 1862
 Pneumodermopsis canephora Pruvot-Fol, 1924
 Pneumodermopsis ciliata (Gegenbaur, 1855) – distribution: circumglobal, oceanic, description: possesses five tentacles, each ending in a big suctorial disk
 Pneumodermopsis macrochira Meisenheimer, 1905 – distribution: oceanic
 Pneumodermopsis michaelsarsi Bonnevie, 1913 – distribution: Bermuda, oceanic
 Pneumodermopsis oligocotyla Massy, 1917
 Pneumodermopsis paucidens (Boas, 1886) – distribution: Brazil, oceanic, length: 5 mm
 Pneumodermopsis pupula Pruvot-Fol, 1926
 Pneumodermopsis spoeli Newman & greenwood, 1988 – Distribution: Australia.
 Pneumodermopsis teschi van der Spoel, 1973 – distribution: oceanic

Genus Schizobrachium Meisenheimer, 1903
 Schizobrachium polycotylum Meisenheimer, 1903 – distribution: oceanic

Genus Spongiobranchaea d'Orbigny, 1836
 Spongiobranchaea australis d'Orbigny, 1836 – distribution: Argentina, Australia, sub-Antarctic, Antarctica, oceanic, length: 22 mm
 Spongiobranchaea intermedia Pruvot-Fol, 1926 – distribution: oceanic image

Genus Abranchaea Zhan Fu-Sui, 1975
 Abranchaea chinensis Zhan Fu-Sui, 1975

Genus Platybrachium Minichev, 1976

References

 
Gastropod families
Taxa named by Pierre André Latreille